Ab Hoga Dharna Unlimited is a 2012 Bollywood comedy-drama film directed by Deepak Tanwar.  The film stars Sunil Pal, Ehsaan Qureshi, Omkar Das Manikpuri, Rekha Rana, and Saurabh Malik.

Cast
 Saurabh Malik	as Rahul
 Rekha Rana as Priya
 Omkar Das Manikpuri as Satya
 Manoj Bakshi	as Kantelel
 Milind Gunaji as Minister
 Sunil Pal as Lakshman Dev Baba
 Ehsaan Qureshi as Tillu
 Sunil Parashar
 Mushtaq Khan
  Chandra Bhushan Singh
 Deepak Tanwar

Critical response
Srijana Mitra Das of The Times of India gave 2.5 out 5 and said " It has rather modest production values but some great lines. It retains the traditional love-story (to its detriment) but goes out on a limb satirizing the political. It's commenting on what's currently happening but in ways not everyone's going to like. It's a cheeky little film - but you may find the laughter a challenge".

References

External links
 

2010s Hindi-language films